Zimmermanniella is a genus of fungi in the family Phyllachoraceae. This is a monotypic genus, containing the single species Zimmermanniella trispora 

The genus and species were circumscribed by Paul Christoph Hennings in Hedwigia vol.41 on page 142 in 1902.

The genus name of Zimmermanniella is in honour of Albrecht Wilhelm Philipp Zimmermann (1860–1931), who was a German botanist.

References

External links
Index Fungorum

Phyllachorales
Monotypic Sordariomycetes genera